, also known as Revolt Ecstasy, is a video album by Japanese singer and songwriter Ringo Sheena, released on 7 December 2000 by Toshiba EMI. It contains a live recording of Sheena during her first tour of the same name.

Sheena also released the video album " simultaneously.

Outline

Gekokujyo Xstasy was the first nationwide tour for Shiina performed from April 17, 2000 to June 7. The live video takes up two performances at NHK Hall and at Fukuoka Sunpalace mainly from this tour.

The stage design of the tour makes a hospital a motif like her single "Honnou." The stage setting imitated an operating room, and an ECG Monitor or an anatomical model of the human body, etc. were arranged on the stage, and the synthesizer and the drum set were laid on operating tables. Shiina wears a white dress looks like gauze bandages with which she blinds her body. Four members of the tour band also wear the white coat.

The recorded songs are chosen from the second album "Shouso Strip" mainly. Some songs containing single "Koko de Kiss Shite", "Gibs", etc. were not recorded. New songs "Yattsuke Shigoto" and "Gamble" shown during this tour weren’t recorded, but, they were recorded in Shiina’s live album "Zecchōshū" instead.

Tracklist 
All tracks written by Ringo Sheena, except "Love is Blind" by Janis Ian.

Personnel 

 Vocals, Electric bass guitar: 椎名林檎Shiina Ringo
 Electric bass guitar: 亀田誠治 Kameda Seiji 
 Electric guitar: 弥吉淳二 Yayoshi Junji
 Synthesizer and Electronic keyboard: 皆川真人 Minagawa Makoto
 Drums: 村石雅行 Muraishi Masayuki
 Strings: Gen Ittetsu's

Tour Dates

References

Ringo Sheena video albums